Francis Gough,  J.P. (1594-1634) was an Anglican bishop in Ireland during the first half of the Seventeenth century.

Gough was born in Wiltshire and educated at St Edmund Hall, Oxford. He was appointed Chancellor of Limerick in 1618; and consecrated Bishop of Limerick in 1626. He died on 29 August 1634.

Notes

Bishops of Limerick (Church of Ireland)
1634 deaths
1594 births
Alumni of St Edmund Hall, Oxford
People from Wiltshire